Charles Henry Adams (April 10, 1824 – December 15, 1902) was an American politician, a  manufacturer, an attorney, and a U.S. Representative from New York, serving one term from 1875 to 1877.

Biography
Born in Coxsackie, New York, Adams attended the public schools, studied law, was admitted to the bar about 1845, and commenced practice in New York City. He married  Elizabeth Platt  and they had three children, Sarah, Mary, and William.

Career
Adams moved to Cohoes in 1850 and in 1851 was appointed with rank of colonel to Governor Washington Hunt's staff in 1851. He was a Know Nothing member of the New York State Assembly (Albany County, 4th District) in 1858.

Having engaged in the manufacture of knit underwear and in banking, Adams retired from the active world of commerce in 1870 and served as first Mayor of Cohoes, New York from 1870 to 1872. He was a delegate to the 1872 Republican National Convention in Philadelphia and a member of the New York State Senate (13th District) in 1872 and 1873. He was United States commissioner from New York to the Vienna Exposition in 1873.

Congress 
Adams was elected as a Republican to the forty-fourth Congress, holding office as U. S. Representative for New York's sixteenth district from March 4, 1875, to March 3, 1877.  He was an unsuccessful candidate for renomination in 1876 and resumed banking in Cohoes until 1892, when he retired and moved to New York City.

Death 
Adams died on December 15, 1902, in Manhattan, New York City; and was buried at the Woodlawn Cemetery in the Bronx.

References

External links

1824 births
1902 deaths
People from Coxsackie, New York
American people of English descent
New York (state) Know Nothings
Republican Party members of the United States House of Representatives from New York (state)
Republican Party members of the New York State Assembly
Republican Party New York (state) state senators
Mayors of places in New York (state)
Burials at Woodlawn Cemetery (Bronx, New York)